WTS Group is an international consulting group with tax, legal and consulting business units. The company was formed in 2000 by former employees from the central tax department of Siemens. Shortly afterwards a large part of the tax department at Mannesmann also joined.

In order to avoid any conflict of interest, WTS refrains from conducting annual audits. In 2017 WTS Group was, based on sales figures, No. 7 of the largest tax advisory firms in Germany 
In 2018 Franz Prinz zu Hohenlohe the former head of the international tax service line at KPMG Germany joined the board of WTS AG. 

In 2020, the Executive Board was expanded with CFO Johannes Krabichler and Jürgen Scholz.

Financial Advisory
In 2009 WTS enlarged its service portfolio by offering financial advisory services. In 2017, WTS acquired the Financial Advisory Boutique FAS AG, which is mainly focused on IFRS consulting, to strengthen the consulting portfolio. In October 2021, Kloepfel Corporate Finance joined the FAS AG to strengthen the M&A competencies with Dr Heiko Frank at the lead to drive forward the expansion of its transaction business.

WTS Global
The WTS Global is a global organization of tax consulting firms and an association under Dutch law (“Vereniging”). The practice was established by WTS Group in 2003. WTS Global operates in about 100 countries worldwide.  

In 2017 Wim Wuyts was appointed to the newly created role of CEO. The WTS Global board of directors comprises the following members: Fritz Esterer (Chairman), Benedicta Du-Baladad, Jorge Espinosa, Edward Mwachinga, Bernard Peeters, Ajay Rotti, Michael Ruth, Magdalena Saja, Jurgen Scholz, and Jared Walls.

In 2020, the French law firm, FIDAL, became a member of WTS Global.

Awards
In 2017, WTS Group was awarded as European Indirect Tax Firm of the Year by International Tax Review and ranked as a Tier 1 network under the category "Tax – Global-wide network" by Chambers & Partners.

In 2018, WTS Group was awarded as German Transfer Pricing Firm of the Year 2018 by International Tax Review.

In 2019, WTS Group was awarded again as WTS Transfer Pricing Firm of the Year Germany.

References

External links
 Official Homepage
 Official Homepage FAS AG

Management consulting firms of the Netherlands
Consulting firms established in 2000
2000 establishments in Germany